Roman Borisovich Shapovalov (born 23 January 1981) is a Russian former football player.

External links
 

1981 births
Sportspeople from Krasnodar
Living people
Russian footballers
Russia under-21 international footballers
FC Dynamo Moscow players
Russian Premier League players
Association football midfielders
FC Kuban Krasnodar players
FC Petrotrest players